The Man Who Loves is a 2008 Italian romance-drama film directed by Maria Sole Tognazzi. It was the opening film at the 2008 Rome Film Festival.

Cast 

Pierfrancesco Favino: Roberto
Kseniya Rappoport: Sara
Monica Bellucci: Alba
Marisa Paredes: Dr. Campo
Michele Alhaique: Carlo 
Arnaldo Ninchi: Vittorio
Piera Degli Esposti: Giulia

See also 
List of Italian films of 2008

References

External links

2008 films
Italian romantic drama films
2008 romantic drama films
Films directed by Maria Sole Tognazzi
2000s Italian films